Norman Stevens may refer to:

 James Norman Stevens, English cricketer
 Norman Stevens, Indigenous Australian boxer
 Norman D. Stevens, library administrator